Toby Leonard Moore (born 28 April 1981) is an Australian actor, best known for his roles as Victor in John Wick (2014), as James Wesley in the Netflix series Daredevil (2015), and Bryan Connerty in the Showtime series Billions (2016–2020). He also appears in The Unusual Suspects, an Australian production airing on SBS.

Early life
Moore was born in Sydney, moving with his family to Hobart, Tasmania, at the age of 11 where he attended St Virgil's College. He is the son of actress and voice artist Robyn Moore, and wanted to be an actor from a young age, doing some work in the Hobart theatre scene and studying acting at the National Institute of Dramatic Art (NIDA) in Sydney.

Acting career
Moore's initial film work involved dubbing Chinese-language films into English. In 2009, he was cast in a small role in the Joss Whedon series Dollhouse, and in 2010, a recurring role in the World War II miniseries The Pacific. In 2015, he appeared in Daredevil as James Wesley, the right hand man and best friend of Wilson Fisk. Since 2016, he has appeared in Billions as Bryan Connerty.

Filmography

Film

Television

Personal life
Moore is married to Australian actress Michelle Vergara Moore, and lives in New York City.

References

External links
 

1981 births
Living people
Australian male television actors
Male actors from Sydney
Male actors from Hobart
Australian male voice actors
National Institute of Dramatic Art alumni
People educated at St Virgil's College